Erin Carroll (born 4 April 1986 in Nhill, Victoria) is an Australian badminton player from Ballarat, Victoria.

Career 
Caroll started playing badminton in 1998, and coaches by her father Rob. She attended Sebastopol Secondary College, where she was a keen participant in Badminton throughout her high school stay. She was part of the Australia national badminton team competed at the 2002 IBF World Junior Championships, 2004 Commonwealth Youth Games, 2006 Commonwealth Games, 2007 Sudirman Cup, and 2008 Summer Olympics. She is now a physical education teacher at Melbourne's Maribyrnong Sports Academy.

Personal life
She married former Australian national badminton player, Benjamin Walklate, and in May 2014, she gave birth a son Charlie Walklate.

Achievements

Oceania Championships
Women's doubles

Mixed doubles

BWF International Challenge/Series
Women's doubles

Mixed doubles

  BWF International Challenge tournament
  BWF International Series tournament
  BWF Future Series tournament

References

External links 
 
 
 
 
 
 
 

1986 births
Living people
Australian female badminton players
Sportswomen from Victoria (Australia)
Badminton players at the 2008 Summer Olympics
Olympic badminton players of Australia
Badminton players at the 2006 Commonwealth Games
Commonwealth Games competitors for Australia